Admiral of the White Sir William Hargood  (6 May 1762 – 12 December 1839) was a British naval officer who served with distinction through the American War of Independence, the French Revolutionary War and the Napoleonic Wars, during which he gained an unfortunate reputation for bad luck, which seemed to reverse following his courageous actions at the battle of Trafalgar in command of HMS Belleisle.

Military service
Born in 1762 into a Royal Navy Dockyard family, the son of a Clerk of the Survey, Hargood was able to secure a position as a midshipman on HMS Triumph, on which he served from 1775 until the following year, in which time he made a convoy to Newfoundland, and then moved to HMS Bristol in which he saw the West Indies and American Eastern Seaboard, being heavily in involved in the landing at Fort Moultrie in 1776. In 1781, Hargood was a lieutenant, serving in the sloop HMS Port Royal when Pensacola fell to the Spanish despite his best efforts to keep it supplied, and in 1782 he was on board HMS Magnificent at the battle of the Saintes. Hargood continued in service in American waters beyond the end of the war, remaining there until he met Captain William Henry (who in 1830 would succeed his brother to become King of the United Kingdom).

Captured by the French in 1793 along with his ship, Hargood was exchanged and honourably acquitted and in 1796 given the 50 gun , a command which ended in disaster, when he was deposed ashore during the Spithead mutiny. On his return at the outbreak of war, he was given the ship of the line HMS Belleisle, a good ship captured from the French in the battle of Groix in 1795. Joining Nelson's fleet in the Mediterranean, Hargood participated in the chase across the Atlantic, and his ship was so worn out it required a refit at Plymouth, only rejoining the fleet two weeks before the battle on 21 October.

During the battle, Belleisle was second in Collingwood's division, following the flagship HMS Royal Sovereign into the enemy lines by just fifteen minutes, and when there held his fire until he was able to discharge both sides simultaneously into the Fougueux and Santa Ana. Belleisle was engaged continuously during the action, often fighting alone against numerous enemy ships, before finally attaching herself to the Argonauta, which she boarded and captured, but not before she was herself dismasted. Belleisle took almost 25% casualties, with 33 dead and 93 wounded, including Hargood, who had suffered severe bruising during the cannonade. Belleisle was lucky to survive the storm, only the constant attentions of the frigate HMS Naiad allowing her to be slowly towed back to Gibraltar.

Following the battle, Hargood, who had been unable to get a favourable commission until this point was suddenly inundated with offers, and after some lucrative shore duties, he was made a rear-admiral and given command of the Channel Islands squadron, which made numerous raids on the French coast and collected a lot of prize money. In 1811 he married Maria Cocks, and they lived happily together until his death despite their failure to have any children. Following the peace in 1815, Hargood retired from the sea, but retained shore duties, and between this date and his death twenty four years later at his home in Bath, he was made a vice admiral, Knight Grand Cross of the Order of the Bath, a Knight Grand Cross of the Royal Guelphic Order, a full Admiral of the White and Commander-in-Chief, Plymouth. Throughout his life he also retained a close and personal friendship with William Henry, even after the latter became King William IV in 1830. He retired to Bath residing at number 9 Royal Crescent until his death and was buried in Bath Abbey where his much faded tombstone can still be seen, along with a lengthy epitaph on a mounted wall plaque.

Further reading 
 Defiant and Dismasted at Trafalgar: The Life and Times of Admiral Sir William Hargood, Mary McGrigor, Leo Cooper Ltd, 2004, 
 The Trafalgar Captains, Colin White and the 1805 Club, Chatham Publishing, London, 2005,

References

External links 
 William Hargood Bio
 Animation of the Battle of Trafalgar

1762 births
1839 deaths
Royal Navy admirals
Knights Grand Cross of the Order of the Bath
Royal Navy captains at the Battle of Trafalgar
Royal Navy personnel of the American Revolutionary War
Royal Navy personnel of the French Revolutionary Wars
Royal Navy personnel of the Napoleonic Wars